The following is the list of award recipients of the Spikers' Turf volleyball tournament in the Philippines, founded in 2015.

Inaugural Conference

Most Valuable Player

Best Outside Spikers

Best Middle Blockers

Best Opposite Spiker

Best Setter

Best Libero

Notes

See also 
Premier Volleyball League award recipients

References 

Lists of volleyball players
Volleyball awards